Robo Recall is a virtual reality first-person shooter game developed and published by Epic Games for Oculus Rift and Oculus Quest platforms. The game was released for the Oculus Rift on March 1, 2017, and an Oculus Quest version titled Robo Recall: Unplugged was released on May 21, 2019. Players that activate their Oculus Touch virtual reality controllers with its software are able to download the game for free.

Plot
Players control Agent 34, an employee of RoboReady, a leading manufacturer of service robots. As a Recaller, it is the player's job to remove "defective" robots from circulation. After a virus causes RoboReady's products to rebel against their human masters, the Recaller must disable all defective models and find the cause of the virus. After collecting rogue robots for research and enabling Robo-Relays to shut down the robots in the area, it is revealed that a rogue robot, called Odin, is the one who released the virus, in which his motive was to make the internet belong to him. It is revealed at the end of the game that one of the A.I bots that was leading the player is actually Odin. The Agent eventually defeats Odin, and everything is fixed.

Gameplay
Gameplay takes place from a first-person perspective. The player can access four different weapons: a pistol, a revolver, a shotgun, and a plasma rifle, holstered on the hip or back. Players move by teleporting, which is controlled with the thumbstick. Although principally a shooter, the game allows players to physically grab enemies, dismantle them, throw them, and in some cases use their weaponry against other enemies. Enemy projectiles like bullets and missiles can also be caught and thrown back at enemies. The game awards point bonuses for certain types of kills, and a multiplier for unbroken kill streaks. Scores are uploaded to online rankings at the end of a stage. Later on in the game, new robot types are introduced, such as spider-like bots that explode, drones that fire lasers, giant bots that fires a huge laser, bots that can stop the player from teleporting, bots that fly and shoot rockets, bots with shields and automatic pistols, and bots that can shoot small guided missiles.

Reception

On the day of release the game received an 8.5 out of 10 rating for IGN. The Guardian gave it a score of 5 stars out of 5. It was nominated for "Best VR Game" in Destructoids Game of 

the Year Awards, and for "Best Shooter" and "Best VR Experience" in IGN's Best of 2017 Awards. It won the award for "Best Virtual Reality Game" in Game Informers Best of 2017 Awards, and for "Best VR Shooter" in their 2017 Shooter of the Year Awards.

Accolades

References

External links

2017 video games
Epic Games games
First-person shooters
Oculus Rift games
Meta Quest games
Single-player video games
Unreal Engine games
Video games about robots
Video games developed in the United States
Windows games